Elections in Nagaland are conducted to elect members of the Lok Sabha and members of the Nagaland Legislative Assembly.

Legislative assembly elections

1964 Nagaland Legislative Assembly election
1969 Nagaland Legislative Assembly election
1974 Nagaland Legislative Assembly election
1977 Nagaland Legislative Assembly election
1982 Nagaland Legislative Assembly election
1987 Nagaland Legislative Assembly election
1989 Nagaland Legislative Assembly election
1993 Nagaland Legislative Assembly election
1998 Nagaland Legislative Assembly election
2003 Nagaland Legislative Assembly election
2008 Nagaland Legislative Assembly election
2013 Nagaland Legislative Assembly election
2018 Nagaland Legislative Assembly election
2023 Nagaland Legislative Assembly election

Lok Sabha elections